Brookings may refer to:

Organizations 
 Brookings Institution, a nonprofit, nonpartisan public policy organization based in Washington, D.C.

Places 
 Brookings, Oregon, USA
 Brookings, South Dakota, USA
 Brookings County, South Dakota, USA

People 
 Brookings (surname)

Other uses 
 Brookings Airport, an airport in Brookings, Oregon
 The Brookings effect, a weather pattern on the Oregon coast
 Brookings Hall the administrative building at Washington University in St. Louis
 Brookings Regional Airport, an airport in Brookings, South Dakota
 The Brookings Report, a 1961 Brookings Institution report on the implications of space travel